The Rushton disc turbine or Rushton turbine is a radial flow impeller used for many mixing applications (commonly for gas dispersion applications) in process engineering and was invented by John Henry Rushton. The design is based on a flat horizontal disk, with flat, vertically-mounted blades. Recent innovations include the use of concave or semi-circular blades.

References

Fluid dynamics
Pumps